The 1911–12 Drexel Blue and Gold men's basketball team represented Drexel Institute of Art, Science and Industry during the 1911–12 men's basketball season. The Blue and Gold, led by 2nd year head coach Frank Griffin, played their home games at Main Building.

Roster

Schedule

|-
!colspan=9 style="background:#F8B800; color:#002663;"| Regular season
|-

References

Drexel Dragons men's basketball seasons
Drexel
1911 in sports in Pennsylvania
1912 in sports in Pennsylvania